Esperiopsis cimensis is a species of demosponges found in the Atlantic waters around Cape Verde, western Africa. The species name is named after the type locality, Ilhéu de Cima.

The species was discovered in 1986 in the waters southeast of Ilhéu de Cima, one of the Ilhéus do Rombo, north of the island Brava, at 165 m depth, on hard bottom with yellow calcareous sand. This is the only place where it has been observed.

References

Poecilosclerida
Fauna of Brava, Cape Verde
Animals described in 2012